The Canso Causeway (Cabhsair Chanso in Gaelic) is a  rock-fill causeway  crossing the Strait of Canso, connecting Cape Breton Island by road to the Nova Scotia peninsula.

The  Canso Canal Bridge is a swing bridge which carries the road and railway line across the canal.

The word "Canso" is believed to be derived from the Mi'kmaq word kamsok, which means "opposite the lofty cliffs."

On July 2, 2014, it was announced that the Government of Canada would transfer ownership of the causeway to the Nova Scotia provincial government. The federal government will still maintain the Canso Canal and the navigational locks.

Ferries
Prior to the construction of the causeway, Cape Breton Island was connected to the mainland by separate railway car and motor vehicle ferries.

In 1880, the Intercolonial Railway (ICR) was opened between Mulgrave on the Nova Scotia side, west to New Glasgow. In 1890, the ICR built a line from Point Tupper on the Cape Breton side, east to Sydney. As a result, a rail ferry service was necessary so that rail cars from Cape Breton Island could be interchanged with the mainland North America rail network.  Initially a small 2-railcar barge was used, however the growth of traffic from Industrial Cape Breton soon mandated that a dedicated rail ferry service be established. This service was operated by the ICR until 1918 when the ICR was merged into Canadian National Railways (CNR).  CNR operated the ferries from 1918 until the causeway opened in 1955. Vessels used included: Mulgrave (1893–1901), Scotia (1903–1955), and Scotia II (1915–1955).

Various private passenger and horse-drawn carriage ferry services operated between Point Tupper or Port Hawkesbury or Port Hastings to the Nova Scotia side.  By the 1930s, the Nova Scotia Department of Transportation took responsibility for providing the automobile ferry service.  By the 1940s, as a result of war-time travel growth, as well as the growing popularity of automobiles, the service was expanded to 24 hours/day.  Toward the end of the service in the 1950s, vessels included the George H. Murray, John Cabot, Ponte de Canseau, and Sir Charles Tupper.

Proposed bridge
In the late 1890s and early 1900s, the Industrial Cape Breton region was experiencing unprecedented economic growth as a result of multiple coal mines and two large integrated steel mills having opened. The Scotia rail car ferry that entered service in 1901 was struggling to keep up with the demands despite operating 24-hours per day year-round. In 1903, an ambitious proposal was presented to the provincial and federal governments, a proposal known as the "Strait of Canso Bridge", detailing a plan to build a  steel cantilever bridge at the narrowest portion of the strait to carry the Intercolonial Railway's main line between Sydney and Truro.

Construction
From 1947 to 1951, articles and cartoons in provincial newspapers indicated that the strait's crossing was to be a bridge. Finally, project engineers agreed that because of the size, the amount of ice, the strength of the currents that filled the Strait of Canso every winter, and the depth of the water, it would be difficult to construct a bridge, and instead, a causeway option was chosen.

About  of rock for building the causeway was quarried from a mountain on Cape Porcupine.

Contracts were awarded from May 1952 to build approach roads and rail lines for the causeway construction, and the project was officially started at a ceremony on September 16, 1952 that was attended by federal Minister of Transport Lionel Chevrier and Premier of Nova Scotia Angus L. MacDonald.

The Strait of Canso was permanently blocked on December 10, 1954, and construction continued through the winter on building the roadway and railway line, as well as finishing the Canso Canal and its swing bridge.  Construction was finally completed on April 13, 1955, when the railway line and the roadway were finished at a cost of $22 million.

The first train across the causeway was a Canadian National Railways work train, led by steam locomotive #2639 on April 18, 1955. The railway line across the causeway entered active service on Saturday, May 14, 1955, when the first revenue train was a 10-car passenger train, led by steam locomotive #6014, and the rail ferry service from Mulgrave to Point Tupper was then discontinued. The roadway across the causeway opened to vehicle traffic on May 20, 1955, when the vehicle ferry service was discontinued.

Official opening
The official opening of the Canso Causeway took place on August 13, 1955 when several thousand people attended ceremonies which included a gala parade of what was meant to be 100 bagpipers heralding Cape Breton's road connection to the North American mainland, however, the 100th bagpiper refused to pipe.

Legacy

When the causeway was completed, the eastern end of the Strait of Canso became ice free during the winter. Several industries were attracted to the Point Tupper area, including the Stora pulp and paper mill, a Gulf Oil refinery and a heavy water plant.

Aside from blocking sea ice, the blocking of the Strait of Canso caused significant environmental damage from the enormous changes in the tidal regime of the southern Gulf of St. Lawrence all the way to the mouth of the St. Lawrence River.  The causeway also had the effect of damming the waterway for migrating ground fish stocks for decades until some of these species were able to determine how to get around Cape Breton Island into the gulf.  In addition, the causeway allowed several non-native species of land animals access onto Cape Breton Island.  One particularly troublesome interloper has been the bobcat, which has slowly forced the more gentle lynx out of its traditional hunting grounds and up into the Cape Breton Highlands.

From 1955 to the early 1990s, the Canso Causeway charged a toll to motorists. The toll was discontinued after the construction costs (approximately $23 million) were paid off.

In 1993, CN Rail sold its Truro-Sydney railway line which crossed the Canso Causeway to the Cape Breton and Central Nova Scotia Railway.  Today, CB&CNS employees operate the swing bridge across the Canso Canal.

References

Transport in Guysborough County, Nova Scotia
Transport in Inverness County, Nova Scotia
Buildings and structures in Guysborough County, Nova Scotia
Buildings and structures in Inverness County, Nova Scotia
Causeways in Canada